Adithya Menon (born 6 April 1974) is an Indian actor who appears in Telugu, Tamil, Malayalam, Kannada and Hindi films.

Early life
Adithya Menon was born in Mumbai into a Malayali family hailing from Palghat in Kerala. His family emigrated to Dubai, UAE and he spent his childhood in Dubai till the age of 18. He finished his schooling from the Our Own English High School Dubai and then migrated back to India. He earned his bachelor's degree in engineering from the M. S. Ramaiah Institute of Technology in Bangalore.

While in college, he auditioned for a slot at being a radio host with Radio Midday. That was his first stint in the media. Soon he started hosting live events like fashion shows and product launches. He worked as a compere and event manager for a few years after getting out of college. During this period he got into amateur theatre in Bangalore and acted in a few plays before being spotted by an actor Prakash Belawadi to star in a Kannada television serial he was to direct for the then launching ETV Kannada. Adithya first faced a camera for this serial, Mussanjeya Kathaprasanga. Subsequently, he was featured as the protagonist for another television serial called Soorya Shikari on the same channel directed by comedian Sihi Kahi Chandru.

He moved to Chennai in 2001 and scouted for work as an actor. He first appeared in a television serial on Sun TV called Thanthira Bhoomi directed by C. Jerrold and produced by Media Dreams. He then won a role in the TV serial Anni directed by K. Balachander. He kept trying to get into cinema and managed to get two movies as a newcomer. He was cast in Anjaneya and Jay Jay at the same time.

In 2014, he garnered attention for playing the lead role in Main Hoon Part-Time Killer,

which garnered controversy for its previous title of Main Hoon Rajinikanth.

Filmography

Actor

Dubbing artist

References

External links 

Official Blog - The Big Bang

Living people
1974 births
Male actors in Hindi cinema
Male actors in Kannada cinema
Male actors in Malayalam cinema
Male actors in Tamil cinema
Male actors in Telugu cinema
Indian atheists
Indian male film actors
Male actors from Chennai
21st-century Indian male actors